Daniel Eduardo Juárez (born 30 July 2001) is an Argentine professional footballer who plays as an right winger for Unión Santa Fe.

Career
Juárez started his career in Primera B Nacional with Gimnasia y Esgrima. After being an unused substitute for fixtures with Brown, Ferro Carril Oeste, Nueva Chicago and Los Andes, the midfielder made his professional bow during a 2–0 defeat in Santiago del Estero to Central Córdoba; featuring for sixty minutes before being substituted off for Fabián Muñoz. He scored a brace on 3 November 2019 during a 3–0 victory over Instituto. On 30 January 2020, Juárez completed a transfer to Primera División side Unión Santa Fe. He was immediately loaned back to Gimnasia for six months until 30 June.

Career statistics
.

References

External links

2001 births
Living people
Sportspeople from Jujuy Province
Argentine footballers
Association football wingers
Primera Nacional players
Gimnasia y Esgrima de Jujuy footballers
Unión de Santa Fe footballers